Fujiwara no Suenori (藤原 季範, 1090 – December 27, 1155) was a Japanese nobleman and High Priest of Atsuta Shrine during the late Heian period, belonging to the Nanke House of the powerful Fujiwara clan. He was the grandfather of Minamoto no Yoritomo, the founder and first shogun of the Kamakura shogunate. He held the court rank of Junior Fourth Rank.

Life 

Suenori was born in 1090, in Owari Province, where his father Fujiwara no Suekane ruled as the acting governor (daikan) of Owari Province. At the time of his birth, his father was considerably old at 47 years of age, and died when Suenori was 12 years old. Suenori's mother was the daughter of Owari Kazumoto, the high priest (daigūji) of Atsuta Shrine. The Owari clan had established the Atsuta Shrine in 192, and held the position of the shrine's high priest since ancient times, passing it down from generation to generation. However, in 1114, Kazumoto handed the position over to Suenori, who was from the Fujiwara clan. Since then, the Fujiwara clan became the head of Atsuta Shrine, while the Owari clan stepped down to the position of adjutant chief priest (gongūji).

In August of the 3rd year of Hōen (1137), Suenori, having seen a dream, passed the position of high priest down to his fifth son, Norimasa. However, after Suenori's death in 1155, his eldest son Noritada took the position from his younger brother.

Outside Owari Province, Suenori spent a lot of his time in Kyoto, and received the court rank of Junior Fourth Rank.

Suenori died in 1155, at the age of 65.

Genealogy 
Suenori was the grandfather of Minamoto no Yoritomo, the founder and first shogun of the Kamakura shogunate, through his daughter Yura Gozen who married Minamoto no Yoshitomo. Thus, besides the Imperial Court, the family had close ties to the samurai military government as well.

Family 
 Father: Fujiwara no Suekane
 Mother: Owari Motoko, daughter of Owari Kazumoto
 Wife: Daughter of Minamoto no Yukihiro
 Eldest son: Fujiwara no Noritada
Unknown mother:
 Fifth son: Fujiwara no Norimasa
 Son: Fujiwara no Norinobu
 Son: Fujiwara no Noritsuna
 Son: Noritomo
 Son: Nagaaki
 Son: Sukenori
 Daughter: Chiaki Ama, Jōsaimon-in's lady-in-waiting
 Daughter: Daishin no Tsubone, Taikenmon-in's lady-in-waiting
 Daughter: Yura Gozen, Minamoto no Yoshitomo's official wife, Yoritomo's mother
 Daughter: Minamoto no Morotaka's wife
Adopted children:
Daughter: Ashikaga no Yoshiyasu's official wife

See also 

 Nanke (Fujiwara)
 Atsuta Shrine

References 

Fujiwara clan
1090 births
1155 deaths
People of Heian-period Japan
Japanese nobility